William Charles Watson (born March 30, 1964) is a Canadian former ice hockey player.  Watson won the Hobey Baker Award in 1985 while playing for the University of Minnesota Duluth. He would go to play professionally in the National Hockey League for the Chicago Blackhawks.

Awards and honours

Career statistics

References

External links
 

1964 births
Living people
Canadian ice hockey forwards
Chicago Blackhawks draft picks
Chicago Blackhawks players
Ice hockey people from Manitoba
Minnesota Duluth Bulldogs men's ice hockey players
Prince Albert Raiders players
Saginaw Hawks players
Hobey Baker Award winners
People from Eastman Region, Manitoba
AHCA Division I men's ice hockey All-Americans